Glipa ishigakiana is a species of beetle in the genus Glipa. It was described in 1932.

References

ishigakiana
Beetles described in 1932